Noh Hyung-Goo (born 29 April 1992) is a South Korean football player who currently plays for Buyeo FC.

Club career
Noh joined K League club Suwon Samsung Bluewings in 2011. On 29 June 2011, he made his senior debut in the 2011 Korean League Cup against Jeju United. He was released in the end of 2012 season.

In April 2013, Noh was signed by J2 League side Roasso Kumamoto. He didn't play any match for Kumamoto in the 2013 season. He left the club in late November 2013.

Noh moved to Chinese Super League newcomer Harbin Yiteng in February 2014. In May 2014, he was released without playing a match in China.

Club statistics

References

External links 
 

1992 births
Living people
Association football defenders
South Korean footballers
Suwon Samsung Bluewings players
Roasso Kumamoto players
Zhejiang Yiteng F.C. players
Chungju Hummel FC players
Chinese Super League players
K League 1 players
K League 2 players
K3 League players
J2 League players
Expatriate footballers in Japan
South Korean expatriate sportspeople in Japan
Expatriate footballers in China
South Korean expatriate sportspeople in China